The Walter HWK 109-509 was a German liquid-fuel bipropellant rocket engine that powered the Messerschmitt Me 163 Komet and Bachem Ba 349 aircraft. It was produced by Hellmuth Walter Kommanditgesellschaft (HWK) commencing in 1943, with licensed production by the Heinkel firm's facilities in Jenbach, Austria.

Design and development

Early versions of the Me 163 had been powered by an earlier design running on a "cold engine" fueled with Z-Stoff. This fuel tended to clog the jets in the combustion chamber, causing fluctuations in power and potentially explosions. Worse, however, was the fact that the engine could not be throttled, and when the aircraft leveled off after its climb to altitude it quickly accelerated to speeds that caused serious compressibility issues. The RLM demanded that a version be developed with a throttle.

During this period Walter had also been working with a new fuel known as C-Stoff that gave off significant heat and was thus known as the "hot engine". C-Stoff was a mix of 30% hydrazine hydrate, 57% methanol, and 13% water, with a small amount of potassium-copper-cyanide. The oxidizer, known as T-Stoff, consisted of an 80%-concentration hydrogen peroxide-based formulation. The two reacted violently on contact. The violent combustion process resulted in the formation of water, carbon dioxide and nitrogen, and a huge amount of heat sending out a superheated stream of steam, nitrogen and air that was drawn in through the hole in the mantle of the engine, thus providing a forward thrust of approximately 17 kN (3,820 lbf).

To address the throttling issue, the new engine included turbopumps with two settings. The pumps were driven by a single turbine, powered by steam created by decomposing the T-Stoff with a wire mesh catalyst. Combined with a mechanical throttle, this provided four power settings from idle to full power for climbing. In practice it was found that throttling the engine dramatically decreased its fuel economy to the point that it did not extend the endurance of the aircraft as expected. This version was put into the Me 163B in spite of this problem.

The ultimate solution to the throttling problem was the B and C series of the engine. This chamber provided that power at peak efficiency, so it did not suffer from the problems found while throttling on the original models. The throttle on the original combustion chamber was removed, and throttling was instead provided by turning the main engine on and off. This new version dramatically improved cruise endurance, with overall flight times improving from eight to twelve minutes, a 50% improvement. It was also mechanically simpler as the turbopumps were no longer throttled.

The engine was an integral design with all components of the drive, with the exception of fuel tanks, locked in a cubical frame — this frame was discarded for the 109-509C dual-chamber design.

Variants

: Pre-production model, manufactured from May 1943. The thrust of this engine was regulated between 300 kp (2.9 kN) and 1500 kp.
: The first series production engine was used in the Messerschmitt Me 163 B from August 1944. The thrust here was adjustable between 100 kp (1 kN) and 1600 kp.
: Version for the Messerschmitt Me 163B-1a. Weighing only  complete, this engine consisted of two main assemblies, the roughly-cubical shape framed forward assembly comprising the turbine housing, the fuel pumps geared to the turbine shaft, the control box, a pressure-reducing valve and the electric starter motor, with the aft assembly made up of the combustion chamber, connected to the fore unit by a cylindrical "thrust-tube" containing pipes which carried fuel to the combustion chamber's individual injector jets. The thrust was adjustable between 200 kp and a maximum of 1700 kp.
: Increased performance version of the 509 A-1. This engine was the initial version to feature the twin Hauptofen main chamber above, and lower thrust Marschofen cruise chamber design directly below the main chamber, with an additional thrust of 300 kp. This auxiliary chamber proved necessary due to the actual T-Stoff oxidizer consumption of the main unit, at nearly 5 kg/s, exceeding estimates by 100%. Thrust from main chamber adjustable between 100 kp and 2000 kp. Fully restored examples of both the Me 163B's single-chamber rocket motor, as well as the only known example — stated as the third prototype example — in the United States of the experimental twin-chamber Walter "509B" rocket motor, are each on display in front, one each to either side of the NMUSAF's restored Me 163B, bearing Werknummer (serial number) 191 095 on its vertical fin.
: Dual-chamber motor like the B-series, based on the uprated version of the 509 A-2, but having a main Hauptofen chamber with a differing forward shape from that on the 509B, while also discarding the open-structure cubical frame for lighter weight. The main combustion chamber gave between 400 kp and 2000 kp, the Marschofen auxiliary chamber 400 kp. To be used in the Me 263 (Ju 248). One surviving example on museum display at the Royal Air Force Museum Cosford.
: Variant of the 509 C-1 for use in the improved B-series airframes of the Bachem Ba 349 Natter. Engine designed to be recovered by parachute, along with the entire rear section with empennage.
 A completely revised lightened version for use as a permanently installed booster rocket on the Messerschmitt Me 262 Heimatschützer IV home defence interceptor.
'HWK RII-211 - Company designation for prototype engines of the 509A-2 series

Applications
 Arado Ar E.381
 Bachem Ba 349
 DFS 228
 Focke-Wulf Volksjäger 2
 Messerschmitt Me 163
 Messerschmitt Me 262C, in Heimatschützer prototype evaluation designs.

Engines on display
National Museum of the United States Air Force (both single-chamber 509 A and twin-chamber 509 B versions)
National Museum of Flight
Cosmosphere
Luftwaffenmuseum der Bundeswehr
Shuttleworth Collection
Ballarat Aviation Museum

Specifications (509A)

See also

References

Notes

Bibliography
Gooden, Brett. Natter: Manned Missile of the Third Reich: Historic Step to Human Spaceflight. Rundle Mall, Australia: Brett Gooden, 2019. 
Jane's Fighting Aircraft of World War II. London. Studio Editions Ltd, 1989.

External links

 The Hellmuth Walter Rocket Engine
  The Hellmuth Walter Rocket Engine sitepage, on the NMUSAF-preserved 509B rocket motor
 Walter 109-509B rocket motor photo-page
 The NMUSAF page on the 509B
 The Hellmuth Walter Rocket Engine sitepage, on the RAF Museum/Cosford-preserved 109-509C rocket motor and photos of the preserved UK-housed 509C rocket motor

Aircraft rocket engines
Rocket engines using hypergolic propellant
109-509
Rocket engines using the gas-generator cycle
Rocket engines using hot cycle hydrogen peroxide propellant